In number theory, the Teichmüller character ω (at a prime p) is a character of (Z/qZ)×, where  if  is odd and  if , taking values in the roots of unity of the p-adic integers. It was introduced by Oswald Teichmüller. Identifying the roots of unity in the p-adic integers with the corresponding ones in the complex numbers, ω can be considered as a usual Dirichlet character of conductor q. More generally, given a complete discrete valuation ring O whose residue field k is perfect of characteristic p, there is a unique multiplicative section  of the natural surjection . The image of an element under this map is called its Teichmüller representative. The restriction of ω to k× is called the Teichmüller character.

Definition

If x is a p-adic integer, then  is the unique solution of  that is congruent to x mod p. It can also be defined by

The multiplicative group of p-adic units is a product of the finite group of roots of unity and a group isomorphic to the p-adic integers. The finite group is cyclic of order p – 1 or 2, as p is odd or even, respectively, and so it is  isomorphic to (Z/qZ)×. The Teichmüller character gives a canonical isomorphism between these two groups.

A detailed exposition of the construction of Teichmüller representatives for the p-adic integers, by means of Hensel lifting, is given in the article on Witt vectors, where they provide an important role in providing a ring structure.

See also
Witt vector

References

Section 4.3 of 

Class field theory